Pioneer Cemetery, also known as Evans Center Cemetery, is a historic cemetery located at Evans Center in Erie County, New York.  It consists of 10 to 11 rows of burials, with the oldest dating to 1810.  The majority of the burials date between 1810 and 1860, with the most recent burial in 1928. Most are marked with simple tablet headstones. It features hilly terrain with a prominent rise at the center of the cemetery.

It was added to the National Register of Historic Places in 2012.

References

External links
 

Cemeteries on the National Register of Historic Places in New York (state)
Cemeteries in Erie County, New York
National Register of Historic Places in Erie County, New York